Luther Azameti known in showbiz as Papi 5Five now Papi Adabraka is a Ghanaian musician, rapper and a former member of music group 5Five (Music Group).

Early life and career
Papi 5Five grew up in Adabraka and started his music career as one half of the music group 5Five (Music Group) in 2005 and then after years of being together he left to start his solo career.

Papi released Location with Mr Drew and Krymi after finally announcing he was going solo.

Discography

Singles 
Location feat Mr Drew and Krymi
Akosua Tilapia feat Vanilla
Boys Taya

Controversy with Appietus
Papi 5Five a member of 5Five (Music Group) and Appietus was engaged in an exchange of words on radio and TV over copyright infringements Appietus has allegedly engaged in against 5Five on their song Move Back (Mujebaya) and a few others.

References

Living people
Year of birth missing (living people)
Ghanaian rappers
21st-century Ghanaian male singers
21st-century Ghanaian singers